Zacarías Reyán (born May 10, 1948), is the pseudonym of Reinaldo Antonio Plazas Peralta, also known as Z. Reyán, a Colombian writer, author of novels, poems and epics in Spanish language . He was born in Chiquinquirá on May 10, 1948. At present, he lives in Bogotá.

Work 

Tierra Dorada: Un Canto a Hispanoamérica (poems, 1977) 
La victoria de los inmortales: el triunfo sobre la miseria (epic poetry, 1979) 
Laberinto 1900-2001: Historia de un Pueblo y dos Mujeres (novel, 1979) 
Cristo Rey: Un Canto a la Obra de Dios (epic poetry, 1979) 
Un Canto a la Tierra y a la Vida: Poesía del Siglo XX y de todos los Tiempos (poems, 2006) 
Biblioteca-Casa Museo Épica 64: Memorias de Zacarías Reyán más un Poema, Far West (memoirs plus a poem, 2007) 
Bicentenario: Nacimiento de un País (historic novel, 2008) 
Obra Completa de Zacarías Reyán (anthology, 2009)

External links 
Zacarías Reyán Official Web Site

References 

1948 births
Living people
People from Chiquinquirá
20th-century Colombian novelists
Colombian male novelists
20th-century Colombian poets
Colombian male poets
21st-century Colombian poets
21st-century male writers
20th-century male writers
21st-century Colombian novelists